Otto Magnus von Stackelberg may refer to:

 Otto Magnus von Stackelberg (ambassador) (1736–1800), Russian diplomat
 Otto Magnus von Stackelberg (archaeologist) (1786–1837), Estonian archeologist